Pantetheinase is an enzyme that in humans is encoded by the VNN1 gene.

This gene product is a member of the Vanin family of proteins which share extensive sequence similarity with each other, and also with biotinidase. The family includes secreted and membrane-associated proteins, a few of which have been reported to participate in hematopoietic cell trafficking. No biotinidase activity has been demonstrated for any of the vanin proteins, however, they possess pantetheinase activity, which may play a role in oxidative-stress response. This protein, like its mouse homolog, is likely a GPI-anchored cell surface molecule. The mouse protein is expressed by the perivascular thymic stromal cells and regulates migration of T-cell progenitors to the thymus. This gene lies in close proximity to, and in same transcriptional orientation as two other vanin genes on chromosome 6q23-q24.

References

Further reading